Clayville Historic District is an  historic district in Foster and Scituate, Rhode Island.  The district encompasses the heart of the village of Clayville, a small 19th-century mill village.  It is centered on the junction of Plainfield Pike, Field Hill Road, and Victory Highway near the Clayville Mill pond, and is roughly bisected by the town line between Foster and Scituate.  The mill pond is impounded by a c. 1847 dam, which powered mills whose ruins and waterways lie downstream.  The village is mainly residential, with vernacular 19th-century construction predominating.  Notable buildings include the Clayville Christian Union Church, built 1867–71 with Greek Revival styling, and the c. 1845 Clayville Schoolhouse.

The district was added to the National Register of Historic Places in 1988.

See also

National Register of Historic Places listings in Providence County, Rhode Island

References

Historic districts in Providence County, Rhode Island
Scituate, Rhode Island
Foster, Rhode Island
Historic districts on the National Register of Historic Places in Rhode Island
National Register of Historic Places in Providence County, Rhode Island